George Butler Wason (April 20, 1869 – 1933) was an American grocer, banker and politician who served as a member of the Massachusetts Governor's Council.

Early life
Wason was born in New Boston, New Hampshire. When he was fifteen Wason moved with his family to Nashua, New Hampshire. In 1889 Wason graduated from Nashua High School.

Business

Grocery business
In July 1889 Wason went to work for the firm of Wason & Pierce Co. wholesale grocers, a firm that was co-owned by his uncle Robert B. Wason. Wason worked in the firm's various departments until 1896, at which time he became the representative of the firm in southern New Hampshire. After Mr. Pierce died in 1896, Wason became a principal of the firm. In 1906, after the death of his uncle, Wason became the head of the firm. The firm was incorporated as The Wason Company, of which Wason was the treasurer and general manager.

Banking career
When the Liberty Trust company was formed, Wason was elected president. He was also a trustee of the North Avenue Savings Bank.

References

American grocers
Businesspeople from Cambridge, Massachusetts
Massachusetts Republicans
Members of the Massachusetts Governor's Council
Politicians from Cambridge, Massachusetts
American bankers
1869 births

1933 deaths
People from New Boston, New Hampshire
People from Nashua, New Hampshire